The 1960 Rice Owls football team represented Rice University during the 1960 NCAA University Division football season. The Owls were led by 21st-year head coach Jess Neely and played their home games at Rice Stadium in Houston, Texas. They competed as members of the Southwest Conference, finishing tied for second. After losing the season opener to Georgia Tech, Rice went on a five game winning streak, reaching as high as 10th in the AP Poll. After losing to SWC foes Arkansas and Baylor, they dropped from the rankings. Regardless, Rice received an invitation to the 1961 Sugar Bowl, played on New Years Day, where they were defeated by co-national champion Ole Miss.

Schedule

References

Rice
Rice Owls football seasons
Rice Owls football